Gilbertiola is a genus of snout and bark beetles in the family Brachyceridae. There are at least two described species in Gilbertiola.

Species
These two species belong to the genus Gilbertiola:
 Gilbertiola helferi (Gilbert, 1956)
 Gilbertiola schusteri (Gilbert, 1956)

References

Further reading

 
 

Brachyceridae
Articles created by Qbugbot